The New England Telephone Building is a historic utility building at 10 Merrymount Road in Quincy, Massachusetts.  This two-story Classical Revival brick structure was built c. 1906 and doubled in size in 1924, reaching its present proportions.  It housed the telephone exchange of the New England Telephone Company until 1940, after which time it was converted to office space.

The building was listed on the National Register of Historic Places in 1989.

See also
National Register of Historic Places listings in Quincy, Massachusetts

References

Industrial buildings and structures on the National Register of Historic Places in Massachusetts
Neoclassical architecture in Massachusetts
Commercial buildings completed in 1906
Buildings and structures in Quincy, Massachusetts
Telephone exchange buildings
Telecommunications buildings on the National Register of Historic Places
National Register of Historic Places in Quincy, Massachusetts
1906 establishments in Massachusetts